Midwater trawling is trawling, or net fishing, at a depth that is higher in the water column than the bottom of the ocean. It is contrasted with bottom trawling. Midwater trawling is also known as pelagic trawling and bottom trawling as benthic trawling.

In midwater trawling, a cone-shaped net can be towed behind a single boat and spread by trawl doors, or it  can be towed behind two boats (pair trawling) which act as the spreading device. Midwater trawling catches pelagic fish such as anchovies, shrimp, tuna and mackerel, whereas bottom trawling targets both bottom living fish (groundfish) and semi-pelagic fish such as: cod, squid, halibut and rockfish.

Whereas bottom trawling can leave serious incidental damage to the sea bottom in its trail, midwater trawling by contrast is relatively benign.

See also
Trawling
Bottom trawling

References
 FAO Fisheries: Midwater Pair Trawls

External links
 Midwater trawls

Fishing equipment
Fishing industry